Jones R. Parker (born ) was a state legislator in Mississippi. He represented Washington County, Mississippi in the Mississippi House of Representatives in 1884 and 1885. He served on the Committee on Public Health and Quarantine.

He served in the state house with fellow Washington County representatives S. M. Spencer and Gilbert Horton.

See also
African-American officeholders during and following the Reconstruction era
Parry Payton

References

African-American state legislators in Mississippi
Members of the Mississippi House of Representatives
People from Washington County, Mississippi
1840s births
Year of birth uncertain
Year of death missing